Don't Look Now is the third studio album by English electronic music group Way Out West. It was released on 5 October 2004 on Distinct'ive Records. It is the only studio album by Way Out West as a trio, with the addition of singer Omi (Emma Everett). The album peaked at number 137 on the UK Albums Chart on release.

Background
Don't Look Now is Way Out West's second and final album release on Distinct'ive Records. The album's lead single, "Anything but You", was released on 21 June 2004 and peaked at 97 on the UK Singles Chart that year. This was followed by the album's release later that year, on 5 October 2004. In 2005, after the album's release, two more singles were released; "Don't Forget Me" on 14 March 2005 (peaked at 246 on the UK Singles Chart), and "Killa" on 15 October 2005 (released on Solaris Recordings and supported by a remix from Orkidea). Ally Kennen, vocalist on "Intensify" from Intensify, reprised her role as vocalist for "Just Like a Man".

The song "Absinthe Dreams" samples "Hushaby Mountain" from Chitty Chitty Bang Bang, and the song "Everyday" samples "Tiergarten" by Tangerine Dream, from Le Parc.

Critical reception
Upon release, Don't Look Now was met with mixed to positive reviews from critics. John Bush from Allmusic described the album negatively, claiming "[the album] isn't impressive", summarising it as "an admitted grab for pop-chart fame", and rated it 2.5 stars out of 5. However, Antonella Sirec from Resident Advisor wrote a positive review, summarising the album as "a pleasurable and sumptuous experience", describing it as "portraying an aspect of electronic dance music as it should be heard", and rated it 4.5 out of 5.

Track listing

Personnel
Way Out West
 Jody Wisternoff – keyboards, synths, samples, programming (all tracks), percussion (Fear)
 Nick Warren – engineering, mixing (all tracks) 
 Emma Everett (Omi) – vocals ("Anything but You", "Don't Forget Me", "Melt", "Fear")

Additional personnel
 Adam Pickard – drums, programming (all except track 12) 
 Marcus Dahl – guitars ("Anything but You", "Don't Forget Me")
 Ally Keenan – vocals ("Just Like a Man")
 Steven Robshaw – guitars, string arrangements ("Just Like a Man")
 Keeling Lee – additional guitars ("Northern Lights")

In popular culture
 The song "Killa" was featured in the 2005 video game Juiced.
 "Anything But You" was featured in the video game Tiger Woods PGA Tour 07.
 "Don't Forget Me" was featured in season two of Grey's Anatomy.
 "Melt" appeared in The O.C. and the season 2 episode "Bones of Contention" from the series Numb3rs.
 "Just Like a Man" appeared on season 3, episode 8 of CSI: Miami.

Charts

References

Way Out West (duo) albums
2004 albums
Distinct'ive Records albums